Stephen Macedo is the Laurance S. Rockefeller Professor of Politics at Princeton University, as well as the former Director for the University Center for Human Values at Princeton.

Education
He earned his B.A. at the College of William and Mary, Master's degrees at the London School of Economics and Oxford University, and his M.A. and Ph.D. at Princeton University. He was an early member of the Oxford Hayek Society.

Academic career
Macedo began his teaching career with the Harvard University Government Department. Next, he held the Michael O. Sawyer chair at the Maxwell School of Citizenship and Public Affairs of Syracuse University, before taking the position he currently holds at Princeton University.

He writes and teaches on political theory, ethics, American constitutionalism, and public policy, with an emphasis on liberalism, justice, and the roles of schools, civil society, and public policy in promoting citizenship. He served as founding director of Princeton's Program in Law and Public Affairs (1999-2001). He recently served as vice president of the American Political Science Association and Chair of its first standing committee on Civic Education and Engagement, and in this capacity he is principal co-author of Democracy at Risk: Public Policy and the Renewal of American Citizenship.

Selected bibliography

Books 
 
 
  (Conference proceedings)

References

External links
Princeton University Center for Human Values
Macedo's Curriculum Vitae
Macedo's biography on Princeton's Politics department page

Princeton University alumni
Harvard University faculty
Syracuse University faculty
Princeton University faculty
College of William & Mary alumni
Living people
Year of birth missing (living people)